Burley Gate is a hamlet in Herefordshire, England. It is north-east from the junction between the A465 road and the A417 road. The hamlet is divided between two civil parishes: Much Cowarne in the east, and Ocle Pychard in the west, with the parish of Moreton Jeffries abutted at the north.

A primary school is in the western part of Burley Gate, and a Tudor house is at the centre.

References

External links

Hamlets in Herefordshire